The Treaty of Munich was signed in 1628 between Holy Roman Emperor Ferdinand II and Duke Maximilian of Bavaria. Based on the terms of the treaty, Ferdinand guaranteed Maximilian dignity as a prince-elector. Moreover, the Emperor allowed Maximilian to control for thirty years the right bank of the Rhine River and the Upper Palatinate.

See also
List of treaties

External links
Catholic Encyclopedia - The Thirty Years War

1628 in Europe
Munich
History of Munich
Electoral Palatinate
1628 treaties
Treaties of the Duchy of Bavaria
1628 in the Holy Roman Empire
17th century in Bavaria
Ferdinand II, Holy Roman Emperor